Bongo Cat is an Internet meme that originated when a Twitter user created and tweeted a GIF of a white cat smacking a table with its two paws. The tweet was then replied to by another Twitter user with an edited version of the GIF including bongos the cat hit to the tune of the Super Mario World soundtrack. The reply went viral and caused the GIF to be edited to many other songs.

History 
The original Bongo Cat GIF originated on May 7, 2018, when an animated cat GIF made by Twitter user @StrayRogue was edited by @DitzyFlama, with the edit including bongos which were hit by the cat to the tune of "Athletic" from the Super Mario World soundtrack. It has later been edited to many other songs and many different instruments in fan-made videos, appearing on social media such as YouTube and Twitter. The meme has covered many songs from video game soundtracks, such as music from Persona 5 and Super Mario, as well as mainstream songs such as Toto’s "Africa" and Darude’s "Sandstorm". After an increase in popularity, Stray Rogue began making and selling Bongo Cat merchandise. Bongo Cat also has been made into an interactive website.

Reception 
Polygon and Uproxx both described Bongo Cat as the best meme of 2018. Ellen Scott of Metro also described as bringing "happiness to all, even in the trashfire [sic] year that was 2018". The Daily Dot described it as the most earnest and wholesome meme of 2018. Reid McCarter of The A.V. Club and Megan Farokhmanesh of The Verge both praised the meme. Nicole Clark of Vice described the meme as "the only good thing on the internet."

References 
 
Fictional cats
Internet memes
Internet memes introduced in 2018